Pouteria latianthera is a species of plant in the family Sapotaceae. It is endemic to Brazil.

References

Flora of Brazil
latianthera
Endangered plants
Taxonomy articles created by Polbot